Neelima is a female given name. Notable people with the name include:

 Neelima Azeem (born 1958), Indian actress
 Neelima Rani (born 1983), Indian actress
 Neelima Sinha (born 1954), American botanist
 Neelima Katiyar, Indian politician
 Neelima Tirumalasetti (born 1975), Indian film and television producer
 Neelima Gupte, Indian physicist